Qalateh Rash (also Romanized as Qalāteh Rash; also known as Qal‘eh Rash and Qal‘eh Tarāsh) is a village in Piran Rural District, in the Central District of Piranshahr County, West Azerbaijan Province, Iran. At the 2006 census, its population was 628, in 110 families.

References 

Populated places in Piranshahr County